Upyanqa (Quechua upyay to drink, -nqa an archaic nominalising suffix to indicate a place destinated for something, "(a place) for drinking", hispanicized spelling Upianca) is a mountain in the Cordillera Central in the Andes of Peru which reaches an altitude of approximately . It is located in the Lima Region, Yauyos Province, in the districts of Colonia and Huantan, north and northeast of a lake and a mountain named Wankarqucha. Upyanqaqucha is the name of a small lake northwest of Upyanqa.

References

Mountains of Peru
Mountains of Lima Region